Cynthia "Cyn" Nabozny (born May 13, 1993) is an American singer and songwriter.

Personal life 
Cyn was born on May 13, 1993 in Michigan. She has described her parents' divorce, which occurred when she was a toddler, as "a big driver of her love for music." By age 16, she was recording and doubling her own vocals. After failing to get into DePaul University's music program, she graduated from the university in Management Information Systems.

She began a relationship with filmmaker Kyle Newman in 2020. They have a son, born February 2021.

Career 

In September 2015, she wrote the song "Only With You", which she performed two months later for Katy Perry. She was subsequently signed by Perry's record label, Unsub Records. Two years after its conception, "Only With You" was released as a single. Her debut single under Unsub was "Together" released in July 2017. Throughout 2018 Cyn opened for Perry's Witness: The Tour across Mexico, made her Bonnaroo debut and toured North America with Years & Years. That year her single "Moment of Truth" was also part of the animated feature film Smallfoot.

Cyn released her debut E.P Mood Swing in September 2019. The seven-track release included songs co-written and produced by both Lars Stalfors and Matias Mora. Cyn describes the work as a "Parisian park" and that most of the songs on it, including lyrics and melody, are built around a single sentence, the "thesis statement". A year later she released a reimagined version of the E.P titled Mood Swing (even moodier). 

In February 2020, Cyn released "Lonely Gun" as part of the original motion picture soundtrack for DC's Birds of Prey, and her song "I Can't Believe" was included as part of the soundtrack for To All the Boys: P.S. I Still Love You.

Cyn wrote and recorded the songs "Drinks" and "Uh-Oh" for the 2020 Oscar-winning motion picture Promising Young Woman. "Drinks" spent two months at U.S Top 40 Radio, peaking at #22 in July of 2020. That June, Cyn released The Mixed Drinks Collection which featured a stripped-down reworking of the song, along with remixes from NERVO, Ladyhawke, MNDR and Uffie. "Drinks" continued to grow in popularity throughout the following year and was featured prominently in high-profile shows Inventing Anna and Gossip Girl. 

In August 2021, Cyn recorded a cover version of Sixpence None the Richer's "Kiss Me" for the Netflix film soundtrack of He's All That (2021)  and in March 2022 released a version of the Karen Elson & Daniel Tashian penned song "Heaven Shine A Light" for the HBO Max original film, Moonshot.

2022 saw Cyn release two singles, "House With A View"  and "Losing Sleep" as she continued work on her full-length debut album, due for release in 2023.

Artistry and influences 
One of the first songs Cyn enjoyed as a child was "Foolish Games" by Jewel. Alongside Jewel, she considers Sheryl Crow and Rosalía her favorite artists. Her grandmother listened to Doris Day. Having been raised near Detroit, she counts Motown as a major influence. Lorde inspired her to use a stage name. 

In 2020, she described early Disney movies as a new influence.

Discography

Extended Plays

Singles

Other Songs

References

External links 

 CYN biography at The Vouge

1993 births
Living people
People from Michigan
Singers from Michigan
DePaul University alumni
Unsub Records artists